The vice president-elect of the United States is the candidate who has won election to the office of vice president of the United States in a United States presidential election, but is awaiting inauguration to assume the office.

There is no explicit indication in the U.S. Constitution as to when that person actually becomes vice president-elect, although the Twentieth Amendment uses the term "Vice President-elect", thus giving the term constitutional justification.

The term corresponds to the term "president-elect of the United States", used for those elected president of the United States for the same period between their election and inauguration.

Incumbent vice presidents who have won re-election for a second term are generally not referred to as vice presidents-elect, as they are already in office and are not waiting to become vice president.

Elections of vice presidents-elect
In many, but not all, instances in which a new vice president has been elected, there is also a change of presidents, with a new president having been elected. This has not always been the case, however. There have been instances in which an incumbent president is reelected with a new vice president-elect as their running mate. This has often been due to an incumbent vice president having not received renomination. The most recent time this happened was in 1944, when Harry S. Truman was elected to replace Henry A. Wallace alongside the ailing three-term president Franklin D. Roosevelt. However, in other instances, this has been due to the vice presidency having been vacant, as there was no way to fill a vice presidential vacancy mid-term until the ratification of the Twenty-Fifth Amendment to the United States Constitution. The most recent time that a new vice president was elected alongside an incumbent president was in 1964, when Hubert Humphrey was elected alongside Lyndon B. Johnson, with the vice presidency being vacant due to Johnson's ascension after the assassination of President John F. Kennedy. Ever since, all elections of new vice presidents have come alongside an election of a new president. No president has sought reelection with a running mate different than their incumbent vice president since Gerald Ford did so unsuccessfully in 1976.

It is possible for an incumbent vice president to win reelection as the running mate of a new president-elect, in which case there would be a United States presidential transition with the election of a new president-elect, but there would be no vice president-elect. This first happened in 1808 when vice president George Clinton, who was originally elected with Thomas Jefferson, was reelected as vice president with James Madison becoming president-elect. This happened again in 1828, when vice president John C. Calhoun, who was elected vice president in 1824 with John Quincy Adams, was re-elected as vice president with Andrew Jackson becoming president-elect.

Roles in presidential transitions

As previously, mentioned, many vice presidents-elect, and all from 1968 onwards, have been elected alongside a new president-elect, meaning that the period before many vice-presidents elects have entered office as vice president have entailed presidential transitions.

Similar to the president-elect, the General Services Administration is authorized by the Presidential Transition Act of 1963 to provide the vice president-elect with funding, office space, and various government services (such as transportation and communications) to accommodate their role in the transition between presidential administrations.

The role that various vice presidents-elect have played in United States presidential transitions has differed.

Two vice presidents-elect have been in charge of presidential transitions as formal chairmen, Dick Cheney in the presidential transition of George W. Bush (2000–01) and Mike Pence in the presidential transition of Donald Trump (2016–17).

Bill Clinton heavily involved Vice President-elect Al Gore in his 1992–93 transition, including him in a group of confidants that joined Clinton in making many of the transition's top decisions. Jimmy Carter allowed Vice President-elect Walter Mondale to play a role in his 1976–77 transition, including allowing him to provide input on some individuals being considered for roles in the administration.

Some presidents-elect have excluded their vice presidents-elect from playing a significant role in their transition. For instance, in Dwight D. Eisenhower's  1952–53 transition, Vice President-elect Richard Nixon did not play an active role. During Nixon's own the 1968–69 transition, Vice President-elect Spiro Agnew was similarly largely uninvolved.

Procedure for replacement
If the vice president-elect dies or resigns before the meeting of the Electoral College in December, the national committee of the winning party would, in consultation with the president-elect, choose a replacement to receive the electoral votes of the vice presidential nominee in the same manner as would happen if the former vice presidential nominee had become president-elect due to the death of the apparent winner. Assuming the requisite number the electors agreed to vote for the replacement candidate, that person would then become the vice president-elect. If such a vacancy were to occur after the electoral votes had been cast in the states, most authorities maintain that no replacement would be chosen and the new president (after taking office) would nominate a vice president, per the provisions of the Twenty-fifth Amendment to the United States Constitution.

Vice President-designate of the United States
Before ratification of the 25th Amendment in 1967, the Constitution contained no provision for filling an intra-term vacancy in the vice presidency. As a result, when one occurred (and did 16 times), the office was left vacant until filled through the next ensuing election and inauguration. Since 1967, the vice presidency has been vacant twice, and a successor was nominated each time to fill the vacancy in accordance with the 25th Amendment. The first instance was in 1973 when Gerald Ford was nominated by President Richard Nixon to succeed Spiro Agnew, who had resigned. The second came in 1974, when Ford, who had succeeded to the presidency following Nixon's resignation, nominated Nelson Rockefeller to succeed him. During both vacancies, the nominee was called vice president-designate, instead of vice president-elect, as neither had been elected to the office.

List of vice presidents-elect

See also
-elect

References

Presidential elections in the United States
United States presidential inaugurations
United States presidential transitions